Bong of the Dead is a 2011 Canadian action horror comedy film directed by Thomas Newman, starring Simone Bailly, Mark Sweatman, Jy Harris and Barry Nerling.

Cast
 Simone Bailly as Leah
 Mark Sweatman as Edwin
 Jy Harris as Tommy
 Barry Nerling as Alex

Release
The film premiered at the Cannes Independent Film Festival.

Reception
The film received a score of 3 out of 5 in HorrorNews.net. Phil Wheat of Nerdly wrote a positive review of the film, writing that "if you like your budgets very low, the gore quotient very high, and huge dollops of stoner humour you might find yourself enjoying it."

Gareth Jones of Dread Central rated the film 2.5 out of 5, writing that "Newman most certainly has the chops to move on to bigger and better things, and gore and zombie fans will find enough to keep them interested — but Bong of the Dead fails to ignite with its script and quickly becomes an experience akin to being the only sober person in a room full of drunk and stoned exhibitionists who think they’re the funniest people on Earth". Joel Harley of Starburst rated the film 4 stars out of 10, writing that "Like its characters, Bong of the Dead is tiresome, annoying and half-baked."

References

External links
 
 

Canadian comedy horror films
2011 horror films
Canadian action comedy films
2011 action films
2011 comedy films
2010s Canadian films